Sir Andrew George Buchanan, 5th Baronet, KCVO, DL (born 1937) is a British farmer and public servant.

The son of the 4th Baronet (an Army officer) and his wife Barbara, daughter of the politician Sir George Stanley, he attended Eton College and Trinity College, Cambridge, and Wye College. After national service, he eventually worked as a chartered surveyor from 1965 to 1970, but later turned to farming.

He was High Sheriff of Nottinghamshire for the 1976–77 year and appointed a deputy lieutenant in 1985, the year after he succeeded to his father's baronetcy; between 1991 and 2012, he was Lord Lieutenant of Nottinghamshire and was appointed a Knight Commander of the Royal Victorian Order in the 2011 New Year Honours for his service in that office.

References 

Living people
1937 births
Baronets in the Baronetage of the United Kingdom
21st-century British landowners
Alumni of Trinity College, Cambridge
Alumni of Wye College
Lord-Lieutenants of Nottinghamshire
Knights Commander of the Royal Victorian Order
High Sheriffs of Nottinghamshire